Chalkboard art or chalk art is the use of chalk on a blackboard as a visual art. It is similar to art using pastels and related to sidewalk art that often uses chalk. Chalkboard art is often used in restaurants, shops or walls.

Characteristics

Chalkboard art is ephemeral.

Chalkboard artists
Chalkboard artists include Catherine Owens, Chris Yoon, Maggie Choate, Bryce Wisdom, C. J. Hughes, Scrojo.

References

Sources

Visual arts media
Chalk